The 1917 Southampton by-election was a by-election held on 19 December 1917 for the House of Commons constituency of Southampton, a two-member seat.

Vacancy
The election was caused by the appointment of one of the sitting Liberal MPs, William Dudley Ward as Vice-Chamberlain of the Household, one of the government whips. Under the Parliamentary rules of the day, Ward was obliged to resign his seat and fight a by-election. The writ for the by-election was moved in Parliament on 10 December 1917.

Candidates
The Liberals re-selected Ward. Being their partners in the coalition government of David Lloyd George, the Unionists were not expected to oppose Ward’s re-election but there was a possibility he would be challenged by a member of Southampton Town Council, Mr Tommy Lewis, the President of the British Seafarers' Union.  However, in the event no other candidates came forward to oppose Ward and he was returned unopposed.

The result

See also
 List of United Kingdom by-elections (1900–1918)

References

1917 elections in the United Kingdom
By-elections to the Parliament of the United Kingdom in Hampshire constituencies
1917 in England
Unopposed ministerial by-elections to the Parliament of the United Kingdom in English constituencies
Elections in Southampton
20th century in Southampton
December 1917 events